David Kaçaj (born 13 September 1996) is an Albanian professional footballer who most recently played for Shënkolli in the Albanian First Division.

References

1996 births
Living people
Footballers from Tirana
Albanian footballers
Association football midfielders
KF Skënderbeu Korçë players
KF Vushtrria players
KF Tërbuni Pukë players
NK Jadran Poreč players
KF Shënkolli players
Kategoria Superiore players
Kategoria e Parë players
Albanian expatriate footballers
Albanian expatriate sportspeople in Kosovo
Expatriate footballers in Kosovo
Albanian expatriate sportspeople in Croatia